Lefty Webb (March 1, 1885 – January 12, 1958) was a baseball player for the Pittsburgh Pirates in 1910. His full name is Cleon Earl Webb. He was a switch hitter and threw left-handed. He was 5'11 and 165 pounds. He went to Ohio Wesleyan University. He was born on March 1, 1885, in Mount Gilead, Ohio. He died on January 12, 1958, in Circleville, Ohio.

External links
 Baseball Reference

1885 births
1958 deaths
People from Mount Gilead, Ohio
Major League Baseball pitchers
Pittsburgh Pirates players
Dallas Giants players
Newark Cotton Tops players
Newark Newks players
Grand Rapids Wolverines players
Grand Rapids Raiders players
Indianapolis Indians players
Ohio Wesleyan Battling Bishops baseball players
Springfield Reapers players
Dayton Veterans players
Grand Rapids Champs players
Baseball players from Ohio
Jamestown Rabbits players